Rock Yuh Butt is a 1988 studio album released by the Washington, D.C.-based go-go band E.U.

Track listing

Side A
"Rock Yuh Butt" (12" version) – (14:02)
"Rock Yuh Butt" (radio version, short) – (5:38)

Side B
"Go-Go in the Sunshine" (Mike Hughes /Roy Ayers) – (5:12)
"E.U. Freeze" (Gregory Elliot / Vernon McDonald) – (9:07)
"Roll Call" (featuring TTED All-stars) – (3:48)

Personnel
 Gregory "Sugar Bear" Elliott – lead vocals, bass guitar
 William "Ju Ju" House – drums
 Genairo "Foxxy" Brown Foxx – congas, percussions
 Timothy "Short Tim" Glover – percussions
 Ivan Goff – keyboards
 Valentino "Tino" Jackson – electric guitar
 Darryel "Tidy Boy" Hayes – trumpet
 Michal "Go Go Mike" Taylor – trombone

References

External links
Rock Yuh Butt at Discogs

1988 albums
Experience Unlimited albums